Des Kennedy may refer to:

Des Kennedy (Australian footballer, born 1944), played for St Kilda and Sandringham
Des Kennedy (Australian footballer, born 1950), played for Hawthorn
Des Kennedy (Irish footballer) (born 1955), played for Limerick F.C., Galway United and Newcastlewest